Palisade Head is a headland on the North Shore of Lake Superior in the U.S. state of Minnesota. It is within  Tettegouche State Park but not contiguous with the rest of that park.

Geology

Palisade Head was formed from a rhyolitic lava flow extruded some 1.1 billion years ago. During the Mesoproterozoic era of the Precambrian eon, the continent spread apart on the Midcontinent Rift System extending from what is now eastern Lake Superior through Duluth to Kansas; this rifting process stopped before an ocean developed. This formed both Palisade Head and Shovel Point, which is within the main part of Tettegouche State Park about two miles (three kilometers) to the east. The feature is a shallow headland, with Lake Superior to the southwest, southeast, and northeast. Its high point is over 300 feet (approximately 90 meters) above the level of the lake; the lakeside cliffs stand up to several hundred feet (60 meters) above water level.

Flora and fauna

The headland is covered by a mixed forest of white spruce, mountain ash, aspen, paper birch, and oak.  Raptors can often be seen soaring over the cliffs.  Peregrine falcons nest on Palisdade Head, Bald eagles nest in the area, and thousands of hawks of several species can be seen migrating along the shoreline in the fall.  There are plentiful wild blueberries and, less commonly, gooseberries.

Deaths
Palisade Head is maintained in its natural state, and one can walk right up to the edge of sheer cliffs with the lake directly below. In April 2010, a forty-eight-year-old woman fell from the top of Palisade Head and was killed. It is believed that this incident was an accident, because the woman was excited about starting a new job at the time of the fall.  On September 11, 2017, a fourteen-year-old girl lost her balance and fell to her death from the top of the cliff.

Human uses
Palisade Head is undeveloped; there are no improvements except for an access road, antenna tower, short-term parking, and a few low rock walls near the edge of the cliffs. On clear days there are views of the Sawtooth Mountains to the northeast, Split Rock Lighthouse to the southwest, the Bayfield Peninsula and Apostle Islands of Wisconsin across the lake to the south, and ship traffic on Lake Superior.

It is a regional center for rock climbing with many routes up the lakeshore cliffs. The majority of the rock climbing routes range from 5.8 to 5.12 on the Yosemite Decimal System grading scale, with a few routes in the 5.13 range. Most of the climbing routes require traditional climbing gear to protect the climber. A novice climber interested in climbing at Palisade Head may inquire with local gear outfitters that guide outdoor climbing trips.

These cliffs were used for more sinister, albeit fictional purposes in The Good Son, partially filmed on location at Palisade Head.

References

External links
 Tettegouche State Park website
 Tettegouche Map and Info

Geology of Minnesota
Volcanism of Minnesota
Rift volcanism
Mesoproterozoic volcanism
Rock formations of Minnesota
Climbing areas of the United States
Protected areas of Lake County, Minnesota
Landforms of Lake County, Minnesota